Binney is surname of Scottish origin. Notable people with the surname include:

 Amos Binney, American physician, malacologist and father of William G. Binney
 Constance Binney (1896–1989), American stage and film actress and dancer
 David Binney, saxophonist and composer
 Don Binney, New Zealand painter
 Edward William Binney (1812–1882), English geologist
 Edwin Binney (1866–1934), inventor of the Crayola crayon
 Fred Binney (born 1946), English former professional footballer
 George Binney (1900–1972), British arctic explorer
 Hibbert Binney (1819–1887), Canadian Church of England bishop
 Horace Binney (1780–1875), American lawyer
 Hugh Binney aka Admiral Sir Thomas Hugh Binney (1883–1953), British naval officer and administrator
 James Binney (born 1950), British astrophysicist
 James Binney (cricketer) (1885–1978), born Edgar James Binney, Australian cricketer
 Jonathan Binney (1723–1807), merchant, judge and political figure in Nova Scotia
 Judith Binney (born 1940) New Zealand historian
 Marcus Binney (born 1944), British architectural historian and author
 Richard J. Binney (born 1983), British neuroscientist and psychologist
 Roy Keith Binney (1886-1957), New Zealand architect
 Thomas Binney (1798–1874), English Congregationalist
 William G. Binney (1833–1909), American malacologist
 William Binney (U.S. intelligence official) (born 1943), American intelligence official and NSA whistleblower

See also 
 Binney & Burnham, an American automobile built in Boston from 1901 to 1902.
 Binney & Smith, a former name for Crayola LLC, an American company for marking utensils
 Binney, Illinois, an unincorporated community, United States

References

Surnames of Scottish origin